John Lewis Hart (December 13, 1917 – September 20, 2009), also credited as John Hilton, was an American film and television actor. In his early career, Hart appeared mostly in westerns. Although Hart played mostly minor roles in some fairly well known films, he was probably best known for having replaced Clayton Moore in the television series The Lone Ranger for one season (1952–53).

Career
Hart began his screen career in 1937 with a bit part in Daughter of Shanghai.  He continued in a variety of B pictures such as Prison Farm and King of Alcatraz before appearing in two of Cecil B. DeMille's films The Buccaneer (1938) and North West Mounted Police (1940). In 1941, Hart's acting career was interrupted when he was drafted into the United States Army.  He rose to the rank of first sergeant in the Coast Artillery and eventually served in the Philippines. Following his military service, Hart worked frequently for Sam Katzman; he was given the lead role in the Jack Armstrong (1947) film serial.  Hart did stunt work and acted in numerous westerns.

Hart was eventually offered the opportunity to replace Clayton Moore on The Lone Ranger television series.  Based on the assumption that the masked character, rather than the actor, was the true star of The Lone Ranger, the program's producers fired Moore (presumably over salary differences) and replaced him with Hart, who was of a similar build and had a comparable background in Westerns.  However, the public never truly accepted Hart as the Lone Ranger, and by 1954 the producers returned Moore to the role.  According to Clayton Moore's autobiography I Was That Masked Man, Moore never knew why he was replaced by Hart, and also stated that he had not sought a pay increase.  Hart acted in minor roles in two episodes of The Lone Ranger before being asked to replace Clayton Moore for the entire third season. The episodes were "Rifles and Renegades" (#34) and "Sheriff at Gunstock" (#46).

Hart continued to act in films for more than two decades, appearing in films of several genres, almost always in supporting roles. Hart appeared twice on the TV series I Love Lucy as Lucy's old boyfriend and again in the Hollywood episodes as a lifeguard at the hotel pool. In 1955, Hart starred in the serial The Adventures of Captain Africa, which was originally intended to be a new movie about famous comic book hero The Phantom. However, licensing issues forced Columbia Pictures to re-film the entire serial and re-christen the hero "Captain Africa."  Hart also had numerous supporting roles in the Highway Patrol TV series. In 1957, Hart portrayed Nat "Hawkeye" Cutler in the syndicated western series Hawkeye and the Last of the Mohicans,. The one-season program was based loosely on the novels of James Fenimore Cooper. It was filmed in Canada and featured some Indians in a favorable image. Interviewed by Tom Weaver in "Western Clippings" magazine (May–June 2000), Hart revealed that he met actress Beryl Braithwaite when she played a role in an episode of the series; they married just days later, with "Hawkeye" co-star Lon Chaney, Jr., the best man at the wedding.

In 1965 Hart made two brief appearances on the TV series Perry Mason, including the role of title character and murder victim Jamison Selff in "The Case of the Wrathful Wraith." In the 1970 film The Phynx, Hart played the Lone Ranger alongside Jay Silverheels as Tonto, spoofing their characters. Hart's last theatrical film appearance was in 1981's The Legend of the Lone Ranger in which he appeared as a newspaper editor.  He appeared in the television series Happy Days as the Lone Ranger in the episode "Hi Yo, Fonzie Away" (February 9, 1982).  In this episode Fonzie, played by Henry Winkler, meets his childhood hero, the Lone Ranger, for his birthday. Hart's other major late appearance was in an episode of The Greatest American Hero, "My Heroes Have Always Been Cowboys", in which Hart gives the title character an inspiring speech about heroism.

Personal life and death

Hart was born in Los Angeles. His mother was named Enid, and he had a sister, Shari. Hart attended South Pasadena High School and later studied acting at the Pasadena Playhouse. He and his wife Beryl had a daughter, Robyn. On September 20, 2009, Hart died from complications of dementia at his home in Playas de Rosarito, Baja California, Mexico at the age of 91. His ashes were scattered into the Pacific Ocean.

Selected filmography 

1937: Daughter of Shanghai - Sailor (uncredited)
1938: The Buccaneer - (uncredited)
1938: Dangerous to Know - Minor Role (uncredited)
1938: Tip-Off Girls - Truck Driver (uncredited)
1938: Hunted Men - Young Man at Party (uncredited)
1938: Prison Farm - 'Texas' Jack
1938: King of Alcatraz - 1st Radio Operator
1938: Touchdown, Army - Cadet Battle (uncredited)
1938: Illegal Traffic - Davis
1939: Disbarred - First Reporter
1939: Persons in Hiding - Male Stenographer
1939: Million Dollar Legs - Haldeman (uncredited)
1939: $1,000 a Touchdown - Buck (uncredited)
1940: North West Mounted Police - Constable Norman (uncredited)
1946: Son of the Guardsman (Serial) - Martin, Bullard soldier (uncredited)
1947: Vacation Days - Big Jim
1947: Jack Armstrong (Serial) - Jack Armstrong
1947: The Vigilantes Return - Henchman (uncredited)
1947: Last of the Redskins - British Sergeant (uncredited)
1947: Brick Bradford (Serial) - Dent
1948: I Love Trouble - Police Detective (uncredited)
1948: Tex Granger: Midnight Rider of the Plains - Crane (uncredited)
1948: Waterfront at Midnight - Woody
1948: The Velvet Touch - Partygoer's Escort (uncredited)
1948: A Southern Yankee - Orderly (uncredited)
1948: Joe Palooka in Winner Take All - Army Sergeant George Malone (uncredited)
1948: The Plunderers - Tom Powers (uncredited)
1949: El Paso - Mr. Ritter (uncredited)
1949: Batman and Robin (Serial) - John Hench / Mechanic [Ch. 2] (uncredited)
1949: Special Agent - Ranch Foreman Frank Kent
1949: Joe Palooka in the Counterpunch - Pedro
1949: The Fighting Redhead - Faro Savage
1949: Cowboy and the Prizefighter - Mark Palmer
1950: Champagne for Caesar - Executive No. 4
1950: State Penitentiary - Sandy' OHara - Convict (uncredited)
1950: Atom Man vs. Superman (Serial) - Henchman in Car [Ch. 3] (uncredited)
1950: Chain Gang - Chain Gang Member (uncredited)
1950: Hit Parade of 1951 - Bandit (uncredited)
1950: Hot Rod - Policeman (uncredited)
1950: Pirates of the High Seas (Serial) - Jenkins - aka Earl Turner [Ch.1] (uncredited)
1950: Revenue Agent - U.S. Border Patroman (uncredited)
1950-1953: The Lone Ranger (TV Series) - The Lone Ranger / Duke / Guard
1951: Colorado Ambush - The Fair-Minded Gambler (uncredited)
1951: Belle Le Grand - Man (uncredited)
1951: Fury of the Congo - Guard (uncredited)
1951: Stagecoach Driver - Slim Cole
1951: Warpath - Sgt. Plennert
1951: The Longhorn - Moresby
1951: The Wild Blue Yonder - General (uncredited)
1951: Texas Lawmen - Marshal Dave (uncredited)
1951: Stage to Blue River - Frederick Kingsley
1952: Texas City - 1st Sergeant (uncredited)
1952: Waco - Texas Ranger Carmody (uncredited)
1952: Aladdin and His Lamp - Gate Guard (uncredited)
1952: Jungle Jim in the Forbidden Land - Commissioner's Secretary (uncredited)
1952: Wild Stallion - Cavalry Corporal (uncredited)
1952: Thief of Damascus - Soldier / Messenger (uncredited)
1952: Kansas Territory - U.S. Marshal Matt Furness
1952: Dead Man's Trail - Ranger Captain (uncredited)
1952: Caribbean - Stuart
1952: The Golden Hawk - Pirate Helmsman (uncredited)
1952: The Pathfinder - British Sergeant
1953: The Lone Ranger (TV Series Season 3) - The Lone Ranger
1953: Prince of Pirates - Captain of the Guards (uncredited)
1953: The Great Adventures of Captain Kidd (Serial) - Jenkins [Chs.4-6, 8-10]
1953-1955: I Love Lucy (TV Series) - Jim Stevens / Lifeguard / Tom Henderson
1954: Gunfighters of the Northwest (Serial) - Sgt. Dan Wells (uncredited)
1955: Dial Red O - Uniformed Deputy (uncredited)
1955: The Adventures of Captain Africa (Serial) - Captain Africa
1956: The Crooked Web - Charlie Holt (uncredited)
1956: Perils of the Wilderness - Henchman (uncredited)
1956: The Ten Commandments - Cretan Ambassador (uncredited)
1957: Hawkeye and the Last of the Mohicans (TV Series~39 episodes~lead character) - Nat 'Hawkeye' Cutler
1958: Wolf Dog - Andy Bates (uncredited)
1958-1962: Leave It to Beaver (TV Series) - Forest Ranger / Construction Worker / Troop #21 Scoutmaster Norton
1959: Diary of a High School Bride - Policeman #1
1959: Inside the Mafia - State Trooper (uncredited)
1959: Vice Raid - Final Thug at Malone's Office (uncredited)
1959-1965: Rawhide (TV Series) - Narbo / Sheriff / Harley Lear
1960: Noose for a Gunman - Dave Barker - Avery Gunman (uncredited)
1960: Bat Masterson - Jacobs (outlaw)
1960: The Subterraneans - Cop (uncredited)
1960: Bells Are Ringing - Party Guest (uncredited)
1961: Go Naked in the World - Club Doorman (uncredited)
1961: Pete and Gladys (CBS, TV Series) - Mervin
1961: Atlantis, the Lost Continent - Nobleman (uncredited)
1961: Ada - Politician at Rally (uncredited)
1962: The Horizontal Lieutenant - Lieutenant (uncredited)
1962: Billy Rose's Jumbo - Marshall (uncredited)
1962: Mister Magoo's Christmas Carol as Billings, Stage Manager, Milkman
1963: The Courtship of Eddie's Father - State Trooper (uncredited)
1963: It Happened at the World's Fair - (uncredited)
1963: The Man from the Diners' Club (1963) - Motorcycle Patrolman (uncredited)
1963: Captain Newman, M.D. (1963) - Officer (uncredited)
1964: Viva Las Vegas - Casino Patron (uncredited)
1964: Marnie - Dr. Gilliat - Minister (uncredited)
1964: 36 Hours - Lt. Cmdr. Perkins (uncredited)
1965: The Sandpiper - Trooper (uncredited)
1965: Zebra in the Kitchen - Zookeeper (uncredited)
1965: The Cincinnati Kid - Poker Player (uncredited)
1965: Day of the Nightmare - Dr. Philip Crane
1966: Hold On! - Detective
1966: Django spara per primo - (English version)
1967: Riot on Sunset Strip - Pritchard
1967: The Fastest Guitar Alive - Mint Guard (uncredited)
1968: Where Were You When the Lights Went Out? - Policeman (uncredited)
1970: The Phynx - The Lone Ranger
1971: Simon, King of the Witches - Doctor (uncredited)
1971: Refinements in Love - Jonas Brown Mart (uncredited)
1972: Bonnie's Kids1972: The Roommates - Sam - Sheriff
1973: Santee - Cobbles
1973: Blackenstein - Dr. Stein
1974: Welcome to Arrow Beach - Doctor
1974: The Centerfold Girls - Sheriff (segment "The First Story")
1975: Gemini Affair - Bob
1976: Blood Voyage - Jules
1977: John Hus Theologian
1978: Invisible Strangler - Harbormaster
1978: Cheerleaders Beach Party - Mr. Langley
1978: Chips (TV series~S2 ep13) - boat owner
1981: The Greatest American Hero (TV Series) - Lone Ranger
1981: The Legend of the Lone Ranger - Lucas Striker
1982: Happy Days'' (TV Series) - Lone Ranger (final appearance)

References

External links

Hawkeye and the Last of the Mohicans Page

1917 births
2009 deaths
Male actors from Los Angeles
United States Army personnel of World War II
American male film actors
American male television actors
Western (genre) television actors
20th-century American male actors
United States Army non-commissioned officers